Promalactis bifurciprocessa is a moth of the family Oecophoridae. It is found in Anhui, China.

The wingspan is about 13.5 mm. The forewings are orange with a narrow white fascia edged with dense black scales. The hindwings and cilia are dark grey.

Etymology
The specific name is derived from Latin bifurcus (meaning bifurcate) and processus (meaning process) and refers to the bifurcate distal process of the left sacculus in the male genitalia.

References

Moths described in 2013
Oecophorinae
Insects of China